Tyrconnell, also spelled Tirconnell, was a kingdom of Gaelic Ireland, associated geographically with present-day County Donegal, which has sometimes been called County Tyrconnell. At times it also included parts of County Fermanagh, County Sligo, County Leitrim, County Tyrone and County Londonderry at its greatest extent. The kingdom represented the core homeland of the Cenél Conaill people of the Northern Uí Néill and although they ruled, there were smaller groups of other Gaels in the area.

From the 5th century founding of Cenél Conaill, the tuatha was a sub-unit of the larger kingdom of Ailech, along with their Cenél nEógain cousins, fellow descendants of Niall of the Nine Hostages. Their initial ascent had coincided with the decline of the Ulaid, whose kingdom of Ulster receded to the north-east coast. In the 12th century the kingdom of Ailech split into two sovereign territories and Cenél Conaill became Tír Chonaill under the Ó Domhnaill (O'Donnell) clan. It was the location of fighting during the Nine Years' War (Ireland) at the end of the 16th century. It continued to exist until the 17th century when it was incorporated into the English-ruled Kingdom of Ireland following the Flight of the Earls.

Geographically
It lay in the area now more commonly referred to as County Donegal, although the kingdom and later principality of Tyrconnell was larger than that, including parts of Sligo, Leitrim (in present-day Republic of Ireland), Tyrone, Fermanagh and a southern part of Londonderry (in present-day Northern Ireland). According to  Geoffrey Keating, it included the baronies of Carbury (in County Sligo), Rosclogher (in County Leitrim), and Magheraboy (mainly Toorah or Tuath Ratha) and Firlurg (in County Fermanagh). As such it had a size varying between that of Corsica (8,680 km2) and Lebanon (10,452 km2).

Associated aristocracy
Although the elective Chieftaincy of O'Donnell is extinct since the abolition of Tanistry and Brehon Law, the Chief of the Name is known as The O'Donnell of Tyrconnell, as recognised by the Chief Herald of Ireland, as the legitimate successor in a putative sequence of Chiefs of the Name (by male primogeniture), and would default to the Duke of Tetuan in Spain in succession to the current Chief, a Franciscan priest, who has no eligible progeny. However, following advice by the Attorney General in 2003, the Genealogical Office discontinued the practice of recognising Chiefs of the Name. The Hereditary Seneschal of Tyrconnell (currently vested in a living O'Donnell, who was already ennobled as a Knight of Malta, and who inherited the Seneschalship from his father), survives under the auspices of the Hereditary Great Seneschal or Lord High Steward of Ireland, currently Charles Chetwynd-Talbot, 22nd Earl of Shrewsbury, senior direct descendant of George Carpenter, 2nd Earl of Tyrconnell (of the 4th creation), and senior kin of Richard Talbot, Duke of Tyrconnel.

Diocese of Raphoe

The religion which predominated at an official level in Tyrconnell was Catholic Christianity. The territory of Tyrconnell was associated with the Diocese of Raphoe under the Bishop of Raphoe, which had been formed in 1111. It was mentioned at the Synod of Ráth Breasail and covered Tír Conaill. Inis Eogain is in the Diocese of Derry. Indeed, the Christian religion was of particular significance to the O'Donnell rulers of Tyrconnell, as their kinsman St. Colm Cille (also known as St. Columba), born at Conwal and Leck, was regarded as one of the three patron saints of Ireland. Their founder and namesake of the kingdom, Conall Gulban, had been the first nobleman converted by St. Patrick. Indeed, they later took up the symbol of the cross as part of one of their heraldic identifiers and adopted the motto in hoc signo vinces.

See also
 List of rulers of Tyrconnell
 Annals of the Four Masters
 Short Annals of Tirconaill
 Annla Gearra as Proibhinse Ard Macha

Related bibliography
Volume IV. See index entry for Tír Chonaill

 The Life of Hugh Roe O'Donnell, Prince of Tyrconnell by Lughaidh Ó Cléirigh. Edited by Fr. Paul Walsh and Colm Ó Lochlainn. Irish Texts Society, vol. 42. Dublin: Educational Company of Ireland, 1948 (original Gaelic manuscript in the Royal Irish Academy in Dublin).
 Annals of the Kingdom of Ireland by the Four Masters, from the earliest period to the year 1616, compiled during the period 1632–1636 by Brother Michael O’Clery, translated and edited by John O'Donovan in 1856, and re-published in 1998 by De Burca, Dublin.
 Blood Royal – From the time of Alexander the Great to Queen Elizabeth II, by Charles Mosley, published for Ruvigny Ltd., London, 2002 
 Vicissitudes of Families, by Sir Bernard Burke, Ulster King of Arms, published by Longman, Green, Longman and Roberts, Paternoster Row, London, 1861. (Chapter on O'Donnells, pages 125–148).
 The Fate and Fortunes of the Earls of Tyrone (Hugh O'Neill) and Tyrconnel (Rory O'Donel), their flight from Ireland and death in exile, by the Rev. C. P. Meehan, MRIA, 2nd edition, James Duffy, London, 1870.
Erin's Blood Royal – The Gaelic Noble Dynasties of Ireland, by Peter Berresford Ellis, Constable, London, 1999, (pages 251–258 on the O'Donel, Prince of Tirconnell).
 Vanishing Kingdoms – The Irish Chiefs and their Families, by Walter J. P. Curley (former US Ambassador to Ireland), with foreword by Charles Lysaght, published by The Lilliput Press, Dublin, 2004 [ & ]. (Chapter on O'Donnell of Tyrconnell, page 59).
 A View of the Legal Institutions, Honorary Hereditary Offices, and Feudal Baronies established in Ireland, by William Lynch, Fellow of the Society of Antiquaries, published by Longman, Rees, Orme, Brown, and Green, Paternoster Row, London, 1830 (O'Donnell: page 190, remainder to Earl's patent).

References

External links
James IV, the O’Donnells of Tyrconnell and the road to Flodden at History Ireland
Donegal Historical Society
O'Donnell at Araltas
O'Donnell heritage online.

States and territories established in the 5th century
O'Donnell dynasty
Kingdoms of medieval Ireland
History of County Donegal
Former kingdoms in Ireland